St Aloysius, Roby, on the outskirts of Liverpool. The church designed by F. X. Velarde and consecrated on 23 April 1885. It is a Roman Catholic church of the Archdiocese of Liverpool.

External links
 official site

Roman Catholic churches in Liverpool
F. X. Velarde buildings